Banwari Lal Agrawal (born 1 May 1947) is an Indian politician and former Member of Legislative Assembly for Katghora Constituency of Chhattisgarh (erstwhile in Madhya Pradesh). He is a member of Bharatiya Janata Party.

Career 
Banwari Lal first contested 1993 Assembly election and defeated Krishnalal Jaiswal of INC by a margin of 7,414 votes and also got re-elected in 1998 Assembly election by defeating Jai Singh Agrawal of Congress from same constituency. After bifurcation of Chhattisgarh from Madhya Pradesh, he again contested 2003 Assembly election from Katghora Constituency against Senior Congress leader Bodhhram Kanwar but lost. Again, he contested 2008 Assembly election from Korba against Jai Singh Agrawal and lost by a margin of only 587 votes.

References

1947 births
Living people
Bharatiya Janata Party politicians from Chhattisgarh
People from Korba, Chhattisgarh
Madhya Pradesh MLAs 1998–2003
Chhattisgarh MLAs 2000–2003